This is a table of river distances of various locations along the Murray, Darling and Namoi Rivers upstream from Hay, New South Wales.

Note that river distances are by their nature imprecise, will always be greater than straight line distances, and frequently greater than road distances. Note the discrepancy between two independent lists published around the same time.

See also
 List of Murray River crossings
 List of Murray River distances
 List of Murrumbidgee River distances
 Murray–Darling basin includes useful chart of tributaries

References 

New South Wales-related lists
Murray-Darling related lists